Kevin Arthur "Dasher" Wheatley, VC (13 March 1937 – 13 November 1965) was an Australian soldier and a recipient of the Victoria Cross, the highest award for gallantry in the face of the enemy that can be awarded to British and Commonwealth forces. Wheatley was one of four Australians to receive the award for actions during the Vietnam War.

Early years
Wheatley was born in the Sydney suburb of Surry Hills on 13 March 1937, the third child of Raymond and Ivy (née Newman) Wheatley, both natives of Sydney. He was educated at Maroubra Junction Junior Technical School. Upon completing his schooling, Wheatley worked as a labourer in Sydney. On 20 July 1954, aged 17, he married Edna Davis; together they would have four children. He was a keen rugby player, and he earned the nickname of "Dasher" on the field.

Military service
On 12 June 1956, at the age of 19, Wheatley enlisted in the Australian Regular Army and after completing basic training he was allocated to the Royal Australian Infantry Corps and posted to the 4th Battalion, Royal Australian Regiment. Early the following year, he was posted to the 3rd Battalion, Royal Australian Regiment and he subsequently served a tour of Malaya between late 1957 and early 1959, during the Malayan Emergency. After his return to Australia, Wheatley served a posting with the 2nd Battalion, Royal Australian Regiment in 1959–61 and then the 1st Battalion, Royal Australian Regiment from 1961 to 1965. He was promoted twice in 1964, firstly to sergeant and then warrant officer. In early 1965, he was posted to the Australian Army Training Team Vietnam and deployed to South Vietnam.

Early in his tour he was involved in an action with Army of the Republic of Vietnam (ARVN) regular troops in Quảng Trị Province. During the fighting, a child ran across the battlefield. Seeing the danger, Wheatley ran after the girl through the cross fire and brought her back to safety, using his own body to shield her. Later, in August 1965, during an attack on a Viet Cong (VC) held village Wheatley was recommended for an award by a US infantry advisor after he single-handedly exploited the position, carrying the attack up a steep slope as the VC forces withdrew. The recommendation was not acted upon at the time, however, and in September Wheatley was transferred to another team, known as the "A Team", who were part of the 5th Special Forces Group. Under the command of Captain Felix Fazekas, the team operated around the village of Tra Bong.

Tra Bong was very isolated, with only a single road providing access. On 13 November, after this road had been captured by the VC, a group of Australian advisors, including Wheatley accompanied a company from the Civil Irregular Defence Group (CIDG) on a "search and destroy mission". Wheatley was assigned to one of the platoons with a fellow warrant officer, Ron Swanton. As the platoon advanced through rice paddies in the vicinity of Binh Hoa, they came under heavy fire from a larger VC force. In the ensuing fighting, Swanton was mortally wounded. As the situation grew more intense, Wheatley requested support from Fazekas and a medical evacuation for Swanton. When his platoon began to scatter, Wheatley carried the wounded Swanton to a safer area as Fazekas moved his troops to support. As the VC closed around his position, Wheatley insisted on staying with Swanton even though he was urged to leave by medical personnel. Wheatley was subsequently killed while defending his comrade.

Victoria Cross citation
Wheatley was 28 years old, and a warrant officer in the Australian Army Training Team when he performed the deed for which he was later awarded the VC. The citation in the London Gazette, which announced Wheatley's award on 15 December 1966 reads:

For his leadership of the attack on the Viet Cong-held village in August 1965, Wheatley was nominated for the US Silver Star, but the award was delayed due to Australian policies regarding the acceptance of foreign awards. The award was finally approved and presented to his son, George, in December 2021. Additionally, the South Vietnamese awarded Wheatley the Knight of the National Order of Vietnam, the Military Merit Medal and the Cross of Gallantry with Palm. Wheatley's award was one of four Victoria Crosses bestowed upon members of the AATTV and was the first awarded to an Australian during the Vietnam War.

Wheatley was buried at Pine Grove Memorial Park in the Western Sydney suburb of Minchinbury, New South Wales. His Victoria Cross is on display at the Australian War Memorial in Canberra, having been donated in 1993.

The stadium in the 1st Australian Support Compound at Vũng Tàu, South Vietnam was named in his honour.

References
Citations

Bibliography

External links

 Wheatley Victoria Cross presentation to the AWM, an account of the presentation of Wheatley's VC to his son and family, Australian War Memorial.
 1965 photo of Wheatley, copyright Australian War Memorial.
 Wheatley VC Rest Area
 Image of Wheatley VC Memorial, in Mawson Park, Campbelltown, NSW.

1937 births
1965 deaths
Military personnel from New South Wales
Australian Army soldiers
Australian military personnel killed in the Vietnam War
Australian military personnel of the Malayan Emergency
Australian recipients of the Victoria Cross
People from New South Wales
Recipients of the Gallantry Cross (Vietnam)
5 Wheatley, Kevin Arthur
Recipients of the Silver Star
Vietnam War recipients of the Victoria Cross